Masao Kishimoto (October 1881 – May 20, 1963) was Director of the Karafuto Agency (December 17, 1931 – July 5, 1932). He was Governor of Akita Prefecture (1922–1924), Yamagata Prefecture (1924), Okayama Prefecture (1927–1928) and Hiroshima (1928–1929).

References
『新編日本の歴代知事』836頁。
『「現代物故者事典」総索引 : 昭和元年～平成23年 1 (政治・経済・社会篇)』408頁。
『日本官僚制総合事典：1868 - 2000』188頁。
『人事興信録』第8版、キ57頁。
『新編日本の歴代知事』174頁。
『新編日本の歴代知事』196頁。
『新編日本の歴代知事』811頁。
『日本官僚制総合事典：1868 - 2000』127頁。

Bibliography
歴代知事編纂会編『新編日本の歴代知事』歴代知事編纂会、1991年。
秦郁彦編『日本官僚制総合事典：1868 - 2000』東京大学出版会、2001年。
『「現代物故者事典」総索引 : 昭和元年～平成23年 1 (政治・経済・社会篇)』日外アソシエーツ株式会社、2012年。
人事興信所編『人事興信録』第8版、1928年。

1881 births
1963 deaths
Japanese Home Ministry government officials
Japanese Police Bureau government officials
Governors of Akita Prefecture
Governors of Yamagata Prefecture
Governors of Okayama Prefecture
Governors of Hiroshima
Directors of the Karafuto Agency
Politicians from Tottori Prefecture
People of the Kwantung Leased Territory
People in agriculture